Mbunda people started migrating to Barotseland now Western Province of Zambia in the latter part of the 18th Century.   The first Mbunda Chiefs to migrate were Chief Mundu of the Mbalango language, followed by his nephew Chief Kandala Viemba and then King Chitengi Chingumbe Chiyengele, in frustration after his succession to his father's throne, in opposition to the Mbunda custom of a nephew. The three were all received by the Aluyi King Mulambwa.  Most of the Mbunda chiefs started migrating at the beginning of the 20th century due to the Mbunda resistance to Portuguese colonial occupation, when the Portuguese colonialists abducted the twenty first (21st) Mbunda Monarch, King Mwene Mbandu I Lyondthzi Kapova.

Due to the Mbunda/Aluyi interaction since the end of the 18th Century in Barotseland, the Mbunda named  the Aluyi King Lubosi "Litunga Liwanika lya mafuti, Njamba kalimi, lifuti limulimina". This is a Mbunda name meaning, "Builder and Uniter of Nations" and depicting an Elephant (Njamba in Mbunda), a Mbunda monarch symbol. This was in recognition of King Lubosi's justice on discovery of the concealment of Aluyi fighters who killed Mbunda commanders after the Aluyi/Tonga war, for fear of the Mbunda getting the credit for the victory over the Tonga, and after the absorption of not only the conquered Makololo, but also the Mbunda immigrants, the Ndebele raiders and the ever-increasing European presence in Barotseland since 1864.

Status of Mbunda Chiefs In Barotseland 
Mbunda Chiefs and their people have continued to be subjective to the Barotse Royal Establishment. Negative reactions from different quarters between the two peoples could be attributed to lack of correct information of subject matters. Mbunda Chieftainships obtaining in Barotseland and elsewhere in Zambia are "Mbunda Institutions" which would not be substituted, and will remain in existence even when a chief in a person is dethroned, by replacement of another Mbunda from the same royal family tree.

Interactive approaches by the 23rd Mbunda Monarch, His Majesty King Mbandu III Mbandu Lifuti of Angola to his counterpart the 24th King of Barotseland, His Majesty Lubosi Imwiko II, in appreciating the time long co-existence with his people and for the continued cordial relationship between the two peoples indicate exemplary statesmanship. Whereas parallel structures of introducing a Mbunda Royal Council or Establishment in Barotseland has never been considered by the Mbunda Monarch in Angola, however, the Mbunda Chiefs in Zambia and Barotseland in particular, having to be installed by the Mbunda Monarch in Angola, while maintaining their subjectivity to the Litunga, for those in Barotseland as practiced in like manner by the Paramount Chief Undi of the Chewa people of Zambia, Malawi and Mozambique would help preserve the Mbunda culture and traditions.

Traditional Mbundaland in Angola recognize chieftainship of all migrant ethnicity living in the land and continue living with them all in harmony, while paying allegiance to their central chieftainship in their countries of origin. Equally, Mbunda people in the diaspora pay allegiance to the Mbunda Monarch in Angola, while recognizing and being subjective, but not subservient to authorities that be in the diaspora.

Following is a list of Mbunda chiefs in Zambia, who ascribe to the 23rd Mbunda monarch His Majesty, King Mwene Mbandu III Mbandu Lifuti in Lumbala Nguimbo, Moxico, Angola:

Chief Mwene Mundu Dynasty 
The first Mbunda Chiefs to settle in Bulozi were of the Mbunda language (Vambalango). The ancestor of the Mbunda Mbalango was a woman chief called Vamwene Nungu in Mbundaland now Angola. Not all of the children succeeded to  chieftainship. Sometimes the succession followed Lozi custom as the Vambalango lived among the Lozi and tended to adopt Lozi customs.

Chief Mwene Kandala Dynasty 
The second Mbunda Chiefs to settle in Bulozi were also of the Mbunda Mbalango dialect (Vambalango). During the reign of Chief Mundu Kalomo ka Chompe, Chief Kandala Vyemba, nephew to Chief Mundu Man'ulumbe fled into Bulozi. Chief Kandala had come into Bulozi to seek asylum for he was being sought for by King Ngonga I Chiteta of the Mbunda ya Mathzi after a domestic dispute between them which had erupted from a theft case that involved the two Royalties in which Chief Kandala's people had stolen an antelope from King Ngonga I Chiteta's hunting trap. Sometimes the succession followed Lozi custom as the Vambalango lived among the Lozi and tended to adopt Lozi customs.

Chief Mwene Chiyengele Dynasty 
The third Mbunda Chiefs to settle in Bulozi were from the central Mbunda Mathzi Chieftainship, which left Mbundaland in frustration due to violation of the Mbunda custom of a son ascendance to the throne rather than a nephew.

Chief Mwene Chikufele Dynasty 
After the death of King Mulambwa, the Makololo defeated and occupied Bulozi. Some Aluyi and Mbundas migrated from Bulozi to other places.
The Mbunda who had supported Prince Mubukwanu, one of Mulambwa's sons left for the now Kabompo. Most of them went to Nakalomo in present-day Lukulu. Here they abandoned their stockade due to Makololo attacks. When Nxaba (Ngabe) in his pursuance to invade the Makololo came to Kakenge's area, (ruler of the Luvale) in the north, he failed to break through the Mbunda fortress at Nakalomo. He then negotiated and tried to persuade the Mbunda to join him and his group, in an alliance against the Kololo. The Mbunda however remained suspicious and merely supplied the Mandebele with guides who took them across the Zambezi westwards in the direction of the Kololo who at that time were pursuing the Luyana fleeing to Nyengo. Those Mandebele were all killed in the valley which was named after them as "Matebele Valley". 
Those Mbunda who in 1830 had, due to Makololo invasion, abandoned Nakalomo went to settle east of Manyinga river finding there only a few Nkoya villages. Prior to 1920, the now Kabompo District was uninhabited. Amongst those that migrated to Manyinga, were Prince Namiluko the son of Mulambwa with his son Chikufele. They took the Nkoya under control and established the headquarters of their leader Chikufele (Sikufele) at what came to be known as Lukwakwa. Prince Namiluko and his son Prince Chikufele established the Mbunda Chieftainship at Kabompo, after the expulsion of the Kalolo inversion. After that,  many of the Mbundas returned to Barotseland but the Chikufele family remained at Lukwakwa. In those years the Chokwes, the Luvales and the Luchazis had not yet migrated to Kabompo. Though there were some Lozi rulers who were allowed to the Lukwakwa throne, it basically remained under the control of the Mbunda. Sikufele became the main chief of all the Manyinga Native Authorities and the Administrative Court remained under the Mbunda after it was restored from the Lunda. While power was being firmly wrestled by the Mbunda in Manyinga area their influence at the Central Throne of the Lozi Kingdom was still felt. After Lubosi Lewanika fled the throne at the insurrection by Mataa and Numwa in 1884, Tatila Akufuna, one who knew not a single word in Luyana nor in Chikololo (Sikololouthe new Lozi), but spoke Mbunda, was called upon to take up the central throne. Tatila Akufuna (son of Imbue) was a direct product of the Mbunda at Lukwakwa.

Chief Mwene Kathimba Dynasty 
This is a Mbunda Chieftainship related to Chief Chitengi Chingumbe Chiyengele, which was later recognised after the Kaonde/Lozi war, which the Lozis won with the help of the Mbunda war machinery, resulting in the Mbunda Chieftainship of Chief Mwene Kathimba having firmly been established at the confluence of the Lalafuta and Kyamenge in 1893, opposite Chief Mushima Njivumina of the Kaonde. The chieftainship of the Chief Mwene Kathimba brought peace to the area. It is said that when the first Mwene Kathimba arrived, Nkoya inhabitants of the area were forced to live in stockaded villages for fear of the Kaonde who were their enemies at that time. But today all three peoples co-exist with mutual respect in Kaoma District of the Western Province of Zambia.

Chief Mwene Chiyengele Chingumbe Dynasty 
This is a Mbunda Chieftainship from King Mwene Chingumbe Chingumbe Cha Choola and related to Chief Chiyengele Chitenge Chingumbe the 15th Mbunda monarch, who migrated to Kayombo in the now Kabompo District. The succession list is not complete; more data will be added in the future.

Chief Mwene Kandombwe Dynasty 
The Mwene Kandombwe chieftainship originates from the central Mbunda royal line (Mbunda-Mathzi). The first Mwene Kandombwe was the son of Chieftainess Vamwene Machalo, one of the three sisters of King Mwene Yambayamba and King Mwene Chingumbe with the Luvale prince-consort named Chivinda cha Nkoshi, in Angola.

Chief Mwene Kasavi Dynasty 
The Mwene Kasavi chieftainship originates from the central Mbunda royal line (Mbunda-Mathzi). The first Chief Mwene Kasavi was the son of King Mwene Nyumbu Luputa (one of the nephews of King Mwene Yambayamba and King Mwene Chingumbe) whose mother Queen Valishano Chikanda was from the Mbunda - Mbalango branch of the Mbunda chieftainship.

Chief Mwene Lindeho Dynasty 
The Mwene Lindeho chieftainship originates from Vamwene Singisingi or Thingithingi, a daughter of Vamwene Ngambo Lyambayi. The first Mwene Lindeho Kanyanyu came to Kalabo District from Nengu in the district of Lumbala Ngimbu in Angola.

See also
Mbunda Kingdom
Mbunda language
Mbunda people
List of The Rulers of the Mbunda Kingdom

References

Further reading
 Terms of Trade and Terms of Trust: The History and Contexts of Pre-colonial ...By Achim von Oppen, page 113
 Abshire, D.M. and Michael Samuels, eds, Angola Handbook, London, 1965 
 Bull, M.M. Bulozi Under the Luyana Kings, London, 1973
 Davidson, Basil, In the Eye of the Storm: Angola's People, New York, 1973,
 Duffy, J. Portuguese West Africa, Cambridge, 1961,
 White, C.M.N. Notes on the Political Organisation of the Kabompo District and its Inhabitants, African Studies, IX, (1950), pp. 185–93.
 José Redinha, Etnias e Culturas de Angola, Luanda: Instituto de Investigação Científica, 1975; reprinted fac-simile by the Associação das Universidades de Língua Portuguesa, 2009,

External links
 National Language Mbunda
 Mbunda Origin
 The Mbunda Kingdom Research and Advisory Council
 Mbunda Kingdom in Angola

Ethnic groups in Angola
Ethnic groups in the Democratic Republic of the Congo
Ethnic groups in Namibia
Ethnic groups in Zambia